Mautern may refer to two municipalities in Austria:

 Mautern an der Donau, in Lower Austria
 Mautern in Steiermark, in Styria